Louis Tourville (22 February 1831 – 4 November 1896) was a Canadian banker and politician.

Born in Montreal, Lower Canada, Tourville was a founder of the Banque d'Hochelaga in 1873 and was its first president until 1878. In 1888, he was appointed to the Legislative Council of Quebec for the division of Alma. A Liberal he served until his death in Montreal in 1896. His son, Rodolphe Tourville, was also a Quebec politician.

References

1831 births
1896 deaths
Burials at Notre Dame des Neiges Cemetery
Quebec Liberal Party MLCs